Dongwang is a town under the administration of Xinle City, in southwestern Hebei province, China, located approximately  east of downtown Xinle. , it has 10 residential communities under its administration.

See also
List of township-level divisions of Hebei

References

Township-level divisions of Hebei